Dana Pe'er is currently the Chair and Professor in Computational and Systems Biology Program at Sloan Kettering Institute, and regarded as one of the leading researchers in computational systems biology. She was selected as a Howard Hughes Medical Institute (HHMI) Investigator in September, 2021. Previously, she was a professor at Columbia Department of Biological Sciences. Pe'er's research focuses on understanding the organization, function and evolution of molecular networks, particularly how genetic variations alter the regulatory network and how these genetic variations can cause cancer.

Education
Pe'er received her bachelor's degree in mathematics in 1995, her master's degree in 1999 and her PhD in computer science in 2003, all from the Hebrew University of Jerusalem. Her PhD work used machine learning and Bayesian networks to automatically infer regulatory relations between genes, using genomics data. Her PhD advisor was Nir Friedman.

She was subsequently a postdoctoral research fellow in the lab of George M. Church in the Department of Genetics at Harvard Medical School, focusing on how genetic variation changes the regulatory network between individuals and how this subsequently manifests in phenotypic diversity.

Research
Pe'er's lab at Columbia University continues her previous research; firstly, developing computational methods to combine diverse sources of high throughput genomics data and secondly, to develop a holistic view of the cell at a systems level.

One particular focus is on developing methods to determine how genetic variation in DNA alters the regulation of gene expression, with a view to applying this knowledge in personalized cancer treatment. For instance, the ability to predict how particular drugs (individually or in combination) will react with tumours would allow drugs to be prescribed on a per-patient basis.

Awards and honours
, Pe’er serves on the advisory board of the journal Cell.

Pe'er has won several prestigious awards including a Burroughs Wellcome Fund Career Award, a NSF CAREER award and a Stand Up To Cancer Innovative Research Grant. She was awarded an NIH Director's New Innovator Award in 2007 in order to investigate how genetic variations can cause changes throughout the whole body which can lead to autoimmune disease and cancer. Pe'er was awarded a Packard Fellowship in Science and Engineering in 2009. She was awarded the ISCB Overton Prize in 2014 for her significant contribution to research, particularly in using computational methods to understand the organization and function of molecular networks in cells. She was selected as a Howard Hughes Medical Institute (HHMI) Investigator in September, 2021.

In 2021, she was elected as a Fellow of the International Society for Computational Biology.

Personal life
Her husband, Itsik Pe'er, is also a computational biologist at Columbia University.

References

American bioinformaticians
Living people
Hebrew University of Jerusalem School of Computer Science & Engineering alumni
Columbia University faculty
Overton Prize winners
1971 births
Place of birth missing (living people)